Arab Pakistani or Pakistani Arab may refer to:

Arabs in Pakistan
Iraqi Biradari
Jalaluddin Surkh-Posh Bukhari 
Pakistani people with Arab origin/descent such as the Sayyids, Arain and Awans
Pakistanis living in Arab countries; see Pakistanis in the Middle East
Multiracial people of Arab and Pakistani descent in any country

See also
Arab–Pakistan relations